Orell is a neighborhood of Louisville, Kentucky centered along Dixie Highway (US 31W) and Orell Road.

Geography

References
  

Neighborhoods in Louisville, Kentucky